Liu Zhixin (born 25 April 1993) is a Chinese ice hockey player and member of the Chinese national team,  playing in the Zhenskaya Hockey League (ZhHL) with Shenzhen KRS. A two-time Olympian, she was the youngest member of the Chinese delegation at the 2010 Winter Olympics, where she represented the country in the women's ice hockey tournament, and also represented China in the women's ice hockey tournament at the 2022 Winter Olympics in Beijing.

Liu previously played in the Canadian Women's Hockey League (CWHL) with Kunlun Red Star WIH during the 2017–18 season and with the Shenzhen KRS Vanke Rays during the 2018–19 season.

Career statistics

Regular season and playoffs

International

Source:

References

External links

1993 births
Living people
Asian Games bronze medalists for China
Asian Games medalists in ice hockey
Asian Games silver medalists for China
Chinese women's ice hockey defencemen
Competitors at the 2015 Winter Universiade
Ice hockey players at the 2010 Winter Olympics
Ice hockey players at the 2011 Asian Winter Games
Ice hockey players at the 2017 Asian Winter Games
Ice hockey players at the 2022 Winter Olympics
Medalists at the 2011 Asian Winter Games
Medalists at the 2017 Asian Winter Games
Olympic ice hockey players of China
Shenzhen KRS Vanke Rays players
Sportspeople from Qiqihar